Scotch College is the name of several schools affiliated with either the Uniting Church or Presbyterian Church. (There are also a number of schools and Roman Catholic seminaries called Scots College.)

 Scotch College, Adelaide, in Torrens Park and Mitcham, South Australia
 Scotch College, Melbourne, in Hawthorn, Victoria
 Scotch College, Perth, in Swanbourne, Western Australia
 Scotch College, Launceston, in Tasmania; amalgamated with Oakburn College in 1979 to form Scotch Oakburn College

Uniting Church schools in Australia
Presbyterian schools in Australia